Supachai Phupa is a retired professional footballer from Thailand. He played in Thai Premier League with teams Krung Thai Bank F.C., Bangkok Glass F.C., BEC Tero Sasana F.C. While he was with Krung Thai, he played for the team in the 2008 AFC Champions League group stages.

He was also part of U-19 Thailand National Football Team and Thailand National Football Team in 2009 Southeast Asian Games.

He has an elder twin brother Surachet Phupa who is also a professional footballer and played in the same team while they were with Suphanburi F.C., Krung Thai Bank F.C., Bangkok Glass F.C.,  Muangthong United F.C., and Chanthaburi F.C.

Playing career
He and his twin brother played football at right back and left back positions, respectively, while they were studying at Suphanburi Sports School and played well enough to become part of Thailand team to compete for AFC U-14 Championship. For their national team performance, they were noticed and signed with the local Division 1 football team Suphanburi F.C.

Both he and his twin brother were acquired by Thailand Premier League team Krung Thai Bank and played for them, including appearances in 2008 AFC Champions League games. They remained with the team when the right to Thailand Premier League team of Krung Thai Bank were transferred to Bangkok Glass in 2009 due to the requirement to register the football team as a corporate as required by Asian Football Confederation would violate Thai financial institution rules. Toward the end of 2009 season, both were not in Bangkok Glass's team building plan and were available for trade.

The twins had a brief stint at Muangthong United F.C., signing them in January 2010 after Bangkok Glass did not extend their contract. The pair then went to Chanthaburi F.C., but after poor performance after the 4th game of 2010 season, the team canceled the contracts of the coaching staffs, and later 9 players including both Supachai and Surachet on 26 April 2010 citing the policy of the new coach. Supachai then signed a two-year contract with another Thailand Premier League time BEC Tero Sasana F.C. on 4 November 2010. In early 2012, Nakhon Ratchasima F.C., a newly created team in Division 1 acquired Supachai and 2 other players from BEC Tero Sasana.

He signed with Ayuthaya F.C. for 2013 season. However he injured his knee in a home game on 29 June 2013 against Khonkaen F.C. Later examination found that his anterior cruciate ligament was torn and required season ending surgery. He signed back with Aythaya F.C. again for the second leg of 2014 season after recovery from the injury. He played for Lampang F.C. for the second leg of 2015 season till 2017 season.

Asian Champions League appearances

References

Living people
Supachai Phupa
1987 births
Supachai Phupa
Supachai Phupa
Supachai Phupa
Twin sportspeople
Supachai Phupa
Association football fullbacks